Four Oddballs of Saigon or The Saigon Fabulous Four is a 1973 Vietnamese 35mm Eastmancolor film directed by La Thoại Tân.

Plot

Production
The film was produced in Saigon in 1973. The football match scene was imitated by Stephen Chow in his 2001 film, Shaolin Soccer.

Art
 Sound : Nguyễn Linh, Nguyên Vũ
 Costume : Thiết Lập Tailor-shop
 Make-up : Âu Ân Bình

Cast

 La Thoại Tân as Lúa / Riz
 Thanh Việt as Râu / Barbe
 Khả Năng as Mập / Graisse
 Tùng Lâm as Lùn / Nain
 Kim Cương as Nhài / Jasmin
 Thẩm Thúy Hằng as Yến / Hirondelle
 Văn Giai as Tycoon
 Pauline Ngọc as Bar singer
 Túy Hoa as A lady who organizes the play "Love story of Lubu and Diaochan"
 Bảo Lâm
 Hùng Phương
 Tùng Phình
 René
 Ngọc Oanh
 Văn Hiếu
 Minh Chánh
 Tư Rọm
 Chí Hiếu
 Đức Phú
 Hoài Mỹ
 Quách Phát
 Hải Thần
 Nguyễn Văn Tầm
 Hoài Dung
 Nguyễn Huỳnh Phước
 Thanh Hồng
 Hoàng Lương
 Tám Trống
 Hải Linh

Release
The movie was released around Asia in the 1974 Lunar New Year with Chinese, English and French subtitles.

See also
 Five Bumpkins
 Shaolin Soccer
 Snow White and the Seven Dwarfs (1937 film)
 "Beautiful Sunday" (song)

References

 
 Four Oddballs of Saigon on EncycloCine
 Four Oddballs of Saigon on FilmWeb
 Sovereignty, Surveillance and Spectacle in The Saigon Fabulous Four
 Four Oddballs of Saigon of La-thoại-Tân in 1973
 Four famous comedians of Four Oddballs of Saigon
 Tứ quái Sài Gòn – Hơn 40 năm tiếng cười chưa tắt
 Cho đời một chút vui

Vietnamese parody films
1970s adventure comedy films
Vietnamese adventure comedy films
1973 films
1970s parody films